(Island Wind) was an experimental destroyer of the Imperial Japanese Navy during World War II, and intended as the lead ship in a projected new "Type C" of destroyers. She was the only destroyer to be armed with 15 torpedo tubes, each capable of firing the deadly  Type 93 "Long Lance" torpedo. The ship also served as a testbed for an enormously powerful, high-temperature, high-pressure steam turbine that was able to develop .

Background
Ordered in 1939 under the 4th Naval Armaments Supplement Programme, Shimakaze was laid down at Maizuru Naval Arsenal in August 1941 and completed on 10 May 1943. Under the 1941 5th Naval Armaments Supplement Programme, a total of 16 Shimakaze-class destroyers were budgeted, with long term plans to build a total of 32 vessels to equip four destroyer squadrons. However, the complexity of the design, coupled with the lack of industrial capacity and resources during the Pacific War prevented these plans from being realized.

Design
Shimakaze was based on a lengthened version of the  design, with an additional 25 feet of length to mount an additional quintuple torpedo launcher amidships. The additional weight caused the design to be top-heavy, so no torpedo reloads were carried; however, with a broadside of  three quintuple mounts which could be trained to either port or starboard, Shimakaze had one of the largest torpedo capacities of any World War II destroyer.

The main battery used on the Yugumo-class of six Type 3 127 mm 50 caliber naval guns in three twin-gun turrets, one superfiring pair aft and one turret forward of the superstructure, was retained as well as the anti-aircraft battery of two twin-mount Type 96 AA guns, and anti-submarine capability of 18 depth charges. She was also equipped with a Type 22 radar.

Her new experimental high temperature and pressure Kampon boilers developed , powering a new type of turbine, which generated 50 percent more power than typical turbines used in previous destroyers. She was expected to reach a speed of 39 kn.

In June 1944, during repairs and refit in Japan, her anti-aircraft capacity was enhanced with the additional set of triple Type 96 guns, seven single Type 96 guns, and one single Type 93 13mm machine gun, together with a Type 13 radar.

Service history
On completion at Maizuru on 10 May 1943,  Shimakaze was assigned to the IJN 1st Fleet, and participated in the evacuation of Japanese troops from Kiska Island towards the end of the Aleutian Islands campaign from July to August, serving as flagship for the screening force. In September and October, she was used to escort vessels between Yokosuka and Truk, and at the end of October escorted the fleet from Truk to Eniwetok due to increasing American air raids. She continued to serve as an escort to ships between Truk and Rabaul and between Truk and Yokosuka though November, and during December and January 1944 she escorted tankers between Truk, Saipan, Palau, Davao and Balikpapan. She was refitted at Kure Naval Arsenal from 17 March to 12 April 1944. Afterwards, she returned to Kure Naval Arsenal for repairs and enhancement of her anti-aircraft weaponry. In July, she escorted troop transports to Okinawa and continued on to Lingga, arriving in Brunei on 20 October.

She was present at the 23–25 October Battle of Leyte Gulf, although she played no role in the battle except for picking up survivors from the sunken battleship  and cruiser Maya. Overloaded with survivors, she stayed at the rear of the fleet during the Battle off Samar and was unable to use her vaunted torpedo broadside. She returned to Manila on 31 October.

On 4 November, Shimakaze was appointed flagship of Destroyer Squadron 2 under the command of Rear Admiral Mikio Hayakawa, and assigned to escort a troop convoy from Manila to Ormoc. She was attacked by American aircraft from Task Force 38 on 11 November 1944 during the Battle of Ormoc Bay, and disabled by strafing and near misses early in the attack. Admiral Hayakawa was killed in action. Shimakaze was removed from the navy list on 10 January 1945.

Wreck 
Shimakaze was discovered by a Paul Allen-led expedition aboard  in Ormoc Bay on 1 December 2017, 715 ft (218 m) below the surface. She was a mangled wreck but the three quintuple torpedo tube launchers confirmed her identity. Photographs from the wreck also debunked the assertion that she had had one of her turrets removed in an early 1944 refit.

Ships in class

References

Sources

Collection of writings by Sizuo Fukui Vol.5, Stories of Japanese Destroyers, Kōjinsha (Japan) 1993, 
The Maru Special, Japanese Naval Vessels No.41 Japanese Destroyers I, Ushio Shobō (Japan), July 1980, Book code 68343-42

External links
MaritimeQuest Shimakaze Page
Shimakaze Class Notes by Allyn Nevitt

World War II destroyers of Japan
Destroyers of the Imperial Japanese Navy
Ships built by Maizuru Naval Arsenal
Experimental ships
Science and technology in Japan
Destroyers sunk by aircraft
World War II shipwrecks in the Philippine Sea
1942 ships
Maritime incidents in November 1944
Ships sunk by US aircraft
Shipwreck discoveries by Paul Allen
2017 archaeological discoveries
Naval magazine explosions